Joe O'Connell may refer to:

Joe M. O'Connell, American novelist
Joe O'Connell (Irish republican) (born 1951), Irish republican and member of the Balcombe Street gang
Joe O'Connell, indie recording artist of Elephant Micah
Joseph E. O'Connell (died 1960), American businessman and racehorse owner
Joseph F. O'Connell (1872–1942), U.S. representative
Joseph John O'Connell (1861–1959), engineer and inventor
Joseph O'Connell (bishop) (1931–2013), Australian bishop